William Whicher Cookson (29 August 1862 – 23 December 1922) was an Indian-born English cricketer who played for Somerset. He was born in Mussoorie and died in Winscombe. He was educated at Clifton College  and RMA Woolwich.
Cookson made a single first-class appearance for the side, during the 1882 season, against Marylebone Cricket Club. Batting as a tailender, he scored eight runs in the only innings in which he batted during the match.

References

External links
William Cookson at Cricket Archive

People educated at Clifton College
1862 births
1922 deaths
English cricketers
Somerset cricketers
People from Mussoorie